Captain Savage and his Leatherneck Raiders is a World War II comic book published by Marvel Comics. The series lasted for nineteen issues, from January 1968 to March 1970. By issue #9 the name was switched to Captain Savage and his Battlefield Raiders. Created by Gary Friedrich and Dick Ayers, the book was a spin-off of the series Sgt. Fury and his Howling Commandos which they wrote at the time. The series was launched when Marvel suddenly received the ability to publish more titles than they had previously due to an embargo.

Publication history
Per issue:

The Last Banzai, January 1968
The Return of Baron Strucker, March 1968
Two Against HYDRA, May 1968
Holocaust On Hydra Island, July 1968
Mission: Destroy the Invisible Enemy, August 1968
Mission: Save a Howler, September 1968
Objective: Ben Grimm, October 1968
Mission: Foul Ball, November 1968
The Gun-Runner, December 1968
To the Last Man, January 1969
Death of a Leatherneck!, February 1969
Pray For Simon Savage!, March 1969
The Junk-Heap Juggernauts, April 1969
Savage's First Mission, May 1969
Within the temple waits... death!, July 1969
War Is Hell--On Ice, September 1969
The unsinkable Jay Little Bear!, November 1969
The high cost of fighting!, January 1970
They Serve in Silence, March 1970

Plot
The series focuses on the characters of the elite Marine Corps team the Leatherneck Raiders and their lives in the Pacific theater of World War II.

Reception
Sales for the series were decent and a proposal to have a Captain Savage of the Silent Service series as a follow up was made, with Savage as a submarine commander, but it was not taken up. Pierre Comtois, the author of the book "Marvel Comics in the 1970s" states that the series was an early experiment from Marvel before they realized that the superhero genre would be the one to dominate the comics market in the foreseeable future. Comtois praised Ayers' artwork and described the dialogue as "smooth and natural sounding", also stating that the plot generally moved forward properly without leaving plot threads hanging. Comtois hypothesised that the series was cancelled due to changing societal norms, such as anti-war sentiment, something which affected many war comics at the time.

See also
 Combat Kelly and the Deadly Dozen, another spin-off of Sgt. Fury

References

External links 
 

Captain Savage and his Leatherneck Raiders at Don Markstein's Toonopedia. Archived from the original on April 9, 2012.

Comics about the United States Marine Corps
Marvel Comics set during World War II
Howling Commandos
1968 comics debuts
1970 comics endings